{{DISPLAYTITLE:C12H16O6}}
The molecular formula C12H16O6 (molar mass: 256.25 g/mol, exact mass: 256.0947 u) may refer to:

 Diethylsuccinoylsuccinate
 Phenyl--galactopyranoside